Sir Pizza is a United States chain of pizza restaurants. Wendell Swartz opened the original restaurant in Lafayette, Indiana, in 1957 under the name of Pizza King. A separate chain, Sir Pizza, also using the Pizza King name, was incorporated in 1965 in Muncie, Indiana by Robert Swartz, Wendell's brother, and in 1966 they expanded their Pizza King outside of Indiana under the name of "Sir Pizza". In Indiana, both chains still operate under the Pizza King name.

Sir Pizza franchise rights have been sold in North Carolina, South Carolina, Tennessee, Michigan, Florida, Indiana, Kentucky, and Pennsylvania.

Food and advertising 
Various Sir Pizza franchises market the pizza with the phrase "Good to the Very Edge", which purports to reference the lack of a traditional crust in Sir Pizza pizzas.  Specifically the pizza pies are "virtually flat with cheese, sauce, and toppings loaded all the way to the very edge."  Sir Pizza is unique in that it does not use more typical sliced pepperoni, rather the topping is ground into crumbles that are spread over the entire pizza, similar to sausage.

Locations

Indiana
There are multiple Pizza King company-owned locations in Muncie, where the chain is based.  Several Pizza King franchises are scattered throughout Indiana.

Kentucky 
In Kentucky, Sir Pizza has multiple franchises in Lexington, along with one restaurant in Winchester.

Michigan 
In Michigan, Sir Pizza has franchises in East Lansing, South Lansing, and Battle Creek.

North Carolina 
In North Carolina, Sir Pizza has franchises in High Point, Thomasville, Troy, Siler City, Asheboro and Randleman.

Pennsylvania 
In Pennsylvania, Sir Pizza has franchises in Pittsburgh, Wexford, and  Warrendale,

Tennessee 
In Tennessee, Sir Pizza has franchises in Murfreesboro, Burns, Antioch, Hermitage, Nashville, Goodlettsville, Shelbyville, Bellevue, Fairview, and LaVergne.

Florida
In Florida, Sir Pizza has one location in Fort Myers and two in the Miami area.

See also 
 Peter Jubeck
 List of pizza chains of the United States

References 

Regional restaurant chains in the United States
Pizza chains of the United States
American companies established in 1957
Pizza franchises
Restaurants established in 1957
1957 establishments in Indiana
Restaurants in Indiana